Abduction is a 2011 American action thriller film directed by John Singleton (in his final directed film before his passing in 2019), produced by Roy Lee and Ellen Goldsmith-Vein, and written by Shawn Christensen. The film stars Taylor Lautner in the lead role alongside, Lily Collins, Alfred Molina, Jason Isaacs, Maria Bello, and Sigourney Weaver in supporting roles.

The film, Singleton's last before his death in 2019, was released by Lionsgate on September 23, 2011. Upon release, the film was panned by the critics, with many criticizing the film's screenplay, cast performances (especially Lautner's) and pace. The film grossed $82 million worldwide against its $35 million production budget. It was nominated for a Golden Reel Award for Dialogue and ADR in a Feature Film.

Plot
Nathan Harper is an 18-year-old high school senior living in the suburbs of Pittsburgh, Pennsylvania with his parents Kevin and Mara. He has troubles from recurring nightmares and has been seeing psychiatrist Dr. Geraldine "Geri" Bennett to treat him.

Nathan is teamed with Karen Murphy for a school research project on missing children. He discovers he looks very much like an age-progression photo of a missing child, Steven Price. His investigations show that he and his parents are probably biologically unrelated. He approaches his mother and she confirms the truth.

Two men claiming to be from the Bridgewater Juvenile Justice Department arrive at Nathan's home while Mara has finished confirming to Nathan that his suspicions are true. Mara is suspicious and attacks the two, but is shot and killed by the intruders. Kevin is also killed, but not before shouting for Nathan to run. Nathan runs but returns for Karen, who is captured. Nathan rescues her and attempts to find out who the man is, but is forced out of the house because of a bomb.

The blast injures Karen, so Nathan takes her to the hospital and attempts to contact the police. His call is intercepted by CIA operative Frank Burton, who tells Nathan he is in danger and he will send two men to collect him. Dr. Bennett helps him and Karen escape. Burton explains that Nathan's biological father, Martin Price, stole an encrypted list of 25 corrupt CIA operatives from the Serbian terrorist and freelance intelligence broker Nikola Kozlow when Nathan was 3. Kozlow then planned on abducting Nathan to coerce Martin to hand over the list. Nathan had been given to his adoptive parents to protect him. Kozlow used the website to claim Nathan as the missing child Steven Price in order to find him. Dr. Bennett gives Nathan the address of a safe house in Arlington, Virginia and tells him to trust only Martin and a man named Paul Rasmus. Burton is warned by his superior to end the situation as soon as possible once he learns of Bennett, who is revealed to be a former CIA operative.

Arriving at the safehouse: the two obtain money, a gun, a photo of Nathan's biological mother Lorna Price, and a cell phone. Karen tries to call her family, but her call is intercepted by Burton and the CIA, as well as Kozlow, forcing them to flee. Finding the address for his mother, the pair discover the address is a cemetery and Lorna has died. Nathan and Karen find fresh flowers at her grave: the sender is Paul Rasmus, who lives in Nebraska. The two take an Amtrak passenger train to get there, using fake IDs provided by their friend Gilly. En route, they confess their feelings and share a kiss. They are unaware that they are being followed by Kozlow's right-hand man, who abducts Karen. He leaves her bound and gagged, but she frees herself. Nathan fights the assailant and throws him out the window. Burton's team finds Kozlow's henchman and tracks them down.

Burton explains the data that Martin had stolen to Nathan, who considers that it may contain Burton's name on the list. The agents are attacked by Kozlow's snipers. Nathan and Karen flee in a car but Kozlow calls and threatens to kill Karen's parents if Nathan does not hand over the data. Nathan gets Kozlow to agree to make the transaction at a Pittsburgh Pirates baseball game at their home stadium, PNC Park.

Nathan works with Gilly to obtain tickets and secures a gun with the intent to kill Kozlow. When Kozlow arrives, he tells Nathan how he killed his mother when Nathan was 3 after she refused to give up Martin's location. Kozlow grabs the gun from Nathan and demands the list, Nathan bolts and Kozlow gives chase, followed by CIA operatives. Nathan is called by Martin, who tells him to trust him and run to the south parking lot. Nathan does so and Kozlow is shot and killed by Martin. Burton and his agents arrive, and Burton asks for the cell phone. However, Martin had warned his superior about Burton's corruption and takes the phone himself while Burton is taken into custody. Martin calls Nathan again, apologizing for not being the father he should have been. Nathan asks him to show himself but Martin refuses. However, he assures Nathan no one will harm him or Karen and then he disappears. Bennett arrives with Karen and says she has arranged for Nathan to live with her until he decides what to pursue in his life. Nathan and Karen go on a date.

Cast

Production

Development
Lionsgate Films bought screenwriter Shawn Christensen's spec script for Abduction in February 2010, with actor Taylor Lautner attached to the film. The studio won a bidding war for the screenplay, acquiring it for $1 million. Gotham Group and Vertigo Entertainment had developed the script, based on a story idea by Gotham's Jeremy Bell.

Lionsgate rushed to start principal photography in July, due to Lautner's schedule to begin work on the last two Twilight films for Summit Entertainment. Writer Jeffrey Nachmanoff was hired to work on the screenplay, and John Singleton signed on to direct in March. Ellen Goldsmith-Vein, Lee Stollman, Roy Lee, and Doug Davison produced the film, and Jeremy Bell and Gabriel Mason executive produced. Lautner's father, Dan Lautner, also produced, the first film from their Tailor Made Entertainment label.

Filming
On a budget of $35 million, principal photography began on July 12, 2010, in the Pittsburgh, Pennsylvania area. Lionsgate returned to the region due to tax benefits from Pennsylvania's tax credit program, after filming My Bloody Valentine 3D, Warrior, and The Next Three Days there in 2008 and 2009. An open casting call for extras held at Carnegie Mellon University drew over 900 people in June, many of whom were teenage fans of the Twilight film series.

Many of the film's scenes were shot in suburban Mount Lebanon, some others in Forward Township, and Brownsville in Fayette County. Scenes were shot at Hampton High School in Hampton Township, a suburb north of Pittsburgh. The school's name and mascot, the Talbot, appeared in the film, as did biology students, cheerleaders, and the marching band. Production continued in Pittsburgh, Mount Lebanon, Greensburg and Hampton Township, and lasted into September 2010.

Music

Reception

Critical response
The review aggregator Rotten Tomatoes gave Abduction an approval rating of 5% based on 108 reviews, with an average rating of 3.4/10. The site's critical consensus read, "A soulless and incompetent action/thriller that not even a veteran lead actor could save, let alone Taylor Lautner." On Metacritic, the film has a weighted average score of 25 out of 100, based on 20 critics, indicating "generally unfavorable reviews". Audiences polled by CinemaScore gave the film an average grade of "B−" on an A+ to F scale.

Kyle Smith of the New York Post said that "actual abduction may be preferable to the movie of the same name, but only if your kidnappers don't torture you by forcing you to watch it", adding that Lautner "has the acting chops of Bert from Sesame Street". R. Kurt Oselund of Slate Magazine was also critical of Lautner, saying that he "can't carry a movie any more than Abigail Breslin can carry a refrigerator." James Berardinelli gave it one out of four stars, saying, "For those who are indifferent to Lautner or who don't like him, the only way to survive Abduction is under the influence of a controlled substance, and even that may not be enough." Catherine Brown of Filmink also gave it a scathing review, saying that "Singleton is poorly equipped to handle teenage angst, a fact made far worse by cringe-worthy dialogue and a wooden leading man who proves that he has not yet developed the skills required to carry a film."

A less critical review came from Owen Gleiberman of Entertainment Weekly, who gave the film a C, commenting that Lautner is "not a terrible actor, but if he wants a career after the Twilight fades, he'll pick better films." Likewise, Roger Moore of the Chicago Tribune gave the film  two out of four stars, saying it "falls in the same corner of the youth market as the Twilight movies. Some moments and many lines feel cribbed from that series." Andrew Barker of Variety called the film "a haggardly slapdash Bourne Identity knockoff, never rising above the level of basic competence."

Box office
Abduction opened in 3,118 theaters in the United States and grossed $10,925,253, with an average of $3,504 per theater and ranking #4 at the box office. The film ultimately earned $28,087,155 domestically and $54,000,000 internationally for a total of $82,087,155 against a budget of $35 million.

Awards
Taylor Lautner was nominated for a Golden Raspberry Award for Worst Actor for his role in the film (also for The Twilight Saga: Breaking Dawn – Part 1), but lost to Grown Ups 2 co-star Adam Sandler for both Jack and Jill and Just Go with It. The film received two nominations for the Teen Choice Awards for Choice Action Movie and Choice Action Actor for Lautner and subsequently won both.

Home media
Abduction was released on North American DVD and Blu-ray on January 17, 2012.

See also
 The Face on the Milk Carton, the 1990 young-adult novel featuring a pre-Internet version of the same premise and later expanded into the Janie Johnson series and adapted into a 1995 television movie

References

External links
 
 
 
 
 
 

2011 films
2011 action thriller films
2010s mystery thriller films
American action thriller films
American mystery thriller films
American political thriller films
2010s English-language films
Films about the Central Intelligence Agency
Films directed by John Singleton
Films produced by Roy Lee
Films scored by Edward Shearmur
Films set in London
Films set in New York (state)
Films set in Pennsylvania
Films set in Virginia
Films set in Pittsburgh
Films shot in Pittsburgh
Lionsgate films
Teen mystery films
Vertigo Entertainment films
2010s American films